O'Duffy is the surname of:

 Eimar O'Duffy (1893-1935), member of the Irish Republican Brotherhood and writer
 Eoin O'Duffy (1892-1944), Irish Republican Army Chief of Staff, soldier and police commissioner
 Paul Staveley O'Duffy (born 1963), British music producer
 Seán O'Duffy (1888-1985), Irish sports administrator of women's camogie

See also
 Duffy (surname)